Savile Brinton Crossley, 1st Baron Somerleyton  (14 June 1857 – 25 February 1935), known as Sir Savile Crossley, Bt, from 1872 to 1916, was a British Liberal Unionist politician who served as Paymaster General from 1902 to 1905.

Background
Crossley was the only son of the businessman and Liberal politician Sir Francis Crossley, 1st Baronet, and his wife Martha Eliza, daughter of Henry Brinton.

Political career
Crossley was elected to parliament for Lowestoft in 1885, as a Liberal. In 1886 he joined the Liberal Unionists and held the seat until 1892 when he chose not to stand again for Lowestoft. 

In 1897 Crossley stood as a Liberal Unionist in a by-election for Halifax. He failed that time but stood again in Halifax in the 1900 general election and won the seat. He was appointed High Sheriff of Suffolk for 1896–97.

Crossley was involved in work regarding the National Coronation gift from the people to their new monarch King Edward VII, and was present as it was awarded to the King two days after the coronation, on 11 August 1902. For his service, he was invested as a Member (fourth class) of the Royal Victorian Order (MVO).

In November 1902 he was appointed Paymaster General in the Conservative government of Arthur Balfour, and was admitted to the Privy Council in December of the same year. He remained in this post until the government fell in December 1905, and he lost his seat in the 1906 general election that followed shortly after. Crossley was never to re-enter the House of Commons.

However, in 1916 he was raised to the peerage as Baron Somerleyton, of Somerleyton in the County of Suffolk; Savile Crossley lived in Somerleyton Hall, as do his descendants.  Two years later he was appointed a Lord-in-waiting (government whip) in the coalition government of David Lloyd George. The coalition fell in 1922, but Somerleyton remained as a whip also in the Conservative administrations of Bonar Law and Stanley Baldwin. However, after the first Baldwin government fell in 1924, he was never to hold ministerial office again.

Military and civic appointments
Crossley held the appointment of honorary major in the Army. He was on 2 April 1893 appointed a captain in The Prince of Wales's Own Norfolk Artillery, a Militia Battalion stationed at Great Yarmouth in Norfolk. He volunteered for active service in South Africa during the Second Boer War, and was on 10 March 1900 appointed captain in the Imperial Yeomanry and attached to its 18th battalion. In early May 1902 he was back as a captain in the Norfolk Artillery. He was promoted to the substantive rank of major and honorary lieutenant-colonel of the battalion later the same month, and later served as lieutenant-colonel commanding the Battalion.

Family
Lord Somerleyton married Phyllis de Bathe, daughter of General Sir Henry Percival de Bathe, in 1887. He died in February 1935, aged 77, and was succeeded in the baronetcy and barony by his eldest son, Francis Savile Crossley. His younger son, John, was the father of Belinda Douglas-Scott-Montagu, Baroness Montagu of Beaulieu. Lady Somerleyton died in 1948.

References

External links 
 

1857 births
1935 deaths
Conservative Party (UK) Baronesses- and Lords-in-Waiting
High Sheriffs of Suffolk
Liberal Unionist Party MPs for English constituencies
Barons in the Peerage of the United Kingdom
Crossley, Savile
Crossley, Savile
Crossley, Savile
UK MPs who were granted peerages
Deputy Lieutenants of Suffolk
Directors of the Great Northern Railway (Great Britain)
Knights Grand Cross of the Royal Victorian Order
Liberal Party (UK) MPs for English constituencies
Members of the Privy Council of the United Kingdom
Liberal Unionist Party peers
Barons created by George V